James Christopher Spencer (born 13 December 1991) is an English professional footballer who plays for Curzon Ashton. A product of the Huddersfield Town academy, he spent much of his career with the club away on loan and later played for English Football League clubs Notts County, Cambridge United, Plymouth Argyle and Mansfield Town.

Career

Huddersfield Town
Spencer originally joined the academy as a seven-year-old in 1998 and progressed through the club's youth system. He was first offered professional terms with the club during the 2009–10 season after being loaned out to Northwich Victoria.

Spencer was then loaned out to Football League Two side Morecambe. Originally a six-month deal, it was extended to a season-long loan in the January transfer window. He made 32 league appearances, scoring eight goals. He signed a new two-year deal at The Galpharm Stadium in May 2011.

On 22 July, Huddersfield Town confirmed that he was set to join League Two side Cheltenham Town on a half-season loan for the 2011–12 season. He scored six goals in 18 matches and an agreement was reached on 28 December 2011, for him to remain on loan for the rest of the season.

Huddersfield Return 2012–13
Spencer made his Huddersfield Town first team début in the League Cup first round 2–0 away defeat at Preston North End on 13 August 2012, playing 75 minutes on his début before being replaced by more experienced striker Alan Lee. He made his league début in the 1–0 defeat by Cardiff City at the Cardiff City Stadium on 17 August, as a late substitute. Spencer signed a one-year contract extension, tying him to the club until 2014 in August 2012.

On 16 October 2012, he joined Football League One side Brentford on a one-month loan deal. He returned on 21 November, after a period on the sidelines.

On 10 January 2013, he joined League One side Crawley Town on loan for the remainder of the season, but his loan was cancelled on 6 February, after he failed to shake off a knee injury, which meant he made no appearances for the Red Devils.

On 22 August 2013, Spencer joined Football League Two side Scunthorpe United on loan until 5 January 2014. The loan was ended on 30 December by the new Iron manager Russ Wilcox. His only goal in his 13 appearances for the club came in the 4–0 win over Rochdale at Spotland on 26 November.

On 31 January 2014, Spencer left Huddersfield after having his contract terminated.

Notts County
On 3 February, Spencer joined Notts County on a short-term contract until the end of the 2013–14 season. On 14 May 2014, Spencer signed a new two-year contract with the Magpies.

Cambridge United
On 29 January 2016, Spencer had his contract with Notts County terminated by mutual consent. On 30 January he joined Cambridge United on an initial six-month deal. That afternoon he came on as a substitute against Leyton Orient and scored with his first touch of the ball.

Plymouth Argyle 
On 29 June 2016, Spencer  signed for Football League Two club Plymouth Argyle

Mansfield Town
Spencer joined Mansfield Town in July 2017. He was released by Mansfield at the end of the 2017–18 season.

Farsley Celtic 
In August 2018, Spencer dropped into non-league football to join Northern Premier League Premier Division club Farsley Celtic. He contributed to the club's automatic promotion to the National League North and its run to the 2019 Northern Premier League Cup Final. Spencer was voted the Northern Premier League Player of the Year and was retained for the 2019–20 season in a dual player-ambassador role.

Curzon Ashton
On 7 February 2023, Spencer signed for National League North rivals Curzon Ashton for an undisclosed fee.

Career statistics

Honours 
Farsley Celtic

 Northern Premier League Premier Division: 2018–19

Individual

 Northern Premier League Player of the Year: 2018–19

References

External links
 (Cheltenham & Morecambe)

1991 births
Living people
Footballers from Leeds
English footballers
Association football forwards
Huddersfield Town A.F.C. players
Northwich Victoria F.C. players
Morecambe F.C. players
Cheltenham Town F.C. players
Brentford F.C. players
Crawley Town F.C. players
Scunthorpe United F.C. players
Notts County F.C. players
Cambridge United F.C. players
Plymouth Argyle F.C. players
Mansfield Town F.C. players
Farsley Celtic A.F.C. players
Curzon Ashton F.C. players
English Football League players
National League (English football) players
Northern Premier League players